Kanif (also Romanized as Kanīf; also known as Keneft) is a village in Doreh Rural District, in the Central District of Sarbisheh County, South Khorasan Province, Iran. At the 2006 census, its population was 29, in 9 families.

References 

Populated places in Sarbisheh County